Where Are You Now, My Son? is the fourteenth studio album (and sixteenth overall) by Joan Baez, released in 1973. One side of the album featured recordings Baez made during a US bombing raid on Hanoi over Christmas 1972. Included on the recording are the voices of Barry Romo, Michael Allen and human rights attorney Telford Taylor, with whom Baez made her famous 1972 visit to North Vietnam.

Joan also recorded a version of this song in which her spoken words and lyrics were in French.  The French version was included in an album published in 1974 with the title bien sûr la guerre est finie.  The rest of the songs are the same as those on the English language versions.

The album's other side, featuring songs written by Baez, Mimi Fariña, and Hoyt Axton, was recorded in Nashville in January 1973.

From the album's liner notes:

Critical reception
AllMusic called "A Young Gypsy" "one of Baez's best original songs."

Track listing
All tracks composed by Joan Baez, except where indicated.

"Only Heaven Knows" - 2:35
"Less Than the Song" (Hoyt Axton) - 3:27
"A Young Gypsy" - 3:36
"Mary Call" (Mimi Fariña) - 3:34
"Rider, Pass By" - 4:13
"Best of Friends" (Mimi Fariña) - 3:03
"Windrose" - 3:42 (On 1980 stereo vinyl reissue by Pickwick Records SPC-3748, this track is excluded)
"Where Are You Now, My Son?" - 21:42

Personnel
Joan Baez – vocals, guitar

Chart positions

References

See also
List of anti-war songs

Joan Baez albums
1973 albums
Songs of the Vietnam War
Albums produced by Norbert Putnam
A&M Records albums